This is a list of the mammal species recorded in South Korea. There are eighty-five mammal species in South Korea, of which six are endangered, six are vulnerable, and two are near threatened. One of the species listed for South Korea is considered to be extinct. The national animal of South Korea is the Siberian tiger.

The following tags are used to highlight each species' conservation status as assessed by the International Union for Conservation of Nature:

Some species were assessed using an earlier set of criteria. Species assessed using this system have the following instead of near threatened and least concern categories:

Order: Rodentia (rodents) 

Rodents make up the largest order of mammals, with over 40% of mammalian species. They have two incisors in the upper and lower jaw which grow continually and must be kept short by gnawing.

Suborder: Sciurognathi
Family: Sciuridae (squirrels)
Subfamily: Sciurinae
Tribe: Sciurini
Genus: Sciurus
 Red squirrel, S. vulgaris 
Tribe: Pteromyini
Genus: Pteromys
 Siberian flying squirrel, P. volans LR/nt
Subfamily: Xerinae
Tribe: Marmotini
Genus: Eutamias
 Siberian chipmunk, E. sibiricus LR/lc
Family: Cricetidae
Subfamily: Cricetinae
Genus: Cricetulus
 Chinese striped hamster, C. barabensis LR/lc
Genus: Tscherskia
 Greater long-tailed hamster, T. triton LR/lc
Subfamily: Arvicolinae
Genus: Clethrionomys
 Gray red-backed vole, C. rufocanus LR/lc
 Northern red-backed vole, C. rutilus LR/lc
Genus: Eothenomys
 Royal vole, E. regulus LR/lc
Family: Muridae (mice, rats, voles, gerbils, hamsters, etc.)
Subfamily: Murinae
Genus: Apodemus
 Striped field mouse, A. agrarius LR/lc
 Korean field mouse, A. peninsulae LR/lc
Genus: Micromys
 Harvest mouse, M. minutus LR/nt
Genus: Rattus
 Tanezumi rat, R. tanezumi LR/lc

Order: Lagomorpha (lagomorphs) 

The lagomorphs comprise two families, Leporidae (hares and rabbits), and Ochotonidae (pikas). Though they can resemble rodents, and were classified as a superfamily in that order until the early 20th century, they have since been considered a separate order. They differ from rodents in a number of physical characteristics, such as having four incisors in the upper jaw rather than two.

Family: Leporidae (rabbits, hares)
Genus: Lepus
 Korean hare, L. coreanus LR/lc

Order: Erinaceomorpha (hedgehogs and gymnures) 

The order Erinaceomorpha contains a single family, Erinaceidae, which comprise the hedgehogs and gymnures. The hedgehogs are easily recognised by their spines while gymnures look more like large rats.

Family: Erinaceidae (hedgehogs)
Subfamily: Erinaceinae
Genus: Erinaceus
 Amur hedgehog, E. amurensis LR/lc

Order: Soricomorpha (shrews, moles, and solenodons) 

The "shrew-forms" are insectivorous mammals. Shrews and solenodons closely resemble mice, while moles are stout-bodied burrowers.

Family: Soricidae (shrews)
Subfamily: Crocidurinae
Genus: Crocidura
 Dsinezumi shrew, C. dsinezumi LR/lc
 Ussuri white-toothed shrew, C. lasiura LR/lc
 Lesser white-toothed shrew, C. suaveolens LR/lc
Subfamily: Soricinae
Tribe: Soricini
Genus: Sorex
 Laxmann's shrew, S. caecutiens LR/lc
 Taiga shrew, S. isodon LR/lc
 Eurasian least shrew, S. minutissimus LR/lc
Family: Talpidae (moles)
Subfamily: Talpinae
Tribe: Talpini
Genus: Mogera
 Large mole, M. robusta LR/lc

Order: Chiroptera (bats) 

The bats' most distinguishing feature is that their forelimbs are developed as wings, making them the only mammals capable of flight. Bat species account for about 20% of all mammals.

Family: Vespertilionidae
Subfamily: Myotinae
Genus: Myotis
 Daubenton's bat, M. daubentonii LR/lc
 Hodgson's bat, M. formosus LR/lc
 Fraternal myotis, M. frater LR/nt
 Whiskered bat, M. mystacinus LR/lc
Subfamily: Vespertilioninae
Genus: Eptesicus
 Kobayashi's bat, E. kobayashii DD
 Northern bat, E. nilssoni LR/lc
Genus: Hypsugo
 Savi's pipistrelle, H. savii LR/lc
Genus: Nyctalus
 Birdlike noctule, N.s aviator LR/nt
Genus: Plecotus
 Brown long-eared bat, P. auritus LR/lc
Genus: Vespertilio
 Asian parti-colored bat, V, superans LR/lc
Subfamily: Murininae
Genus: Murina
 Greater tube-nosed bat, M. leucogaster LR/lc
 Ussuri tube-nosed bat, M. ussuriensis EN
Subfamily: Miniopterinae
Genus: Miniopterus
 Schreibers' long-fingered bat, M. schreibersii LC
Family: Molossidae
Genus: Tadarida
 European free-tailed bat, T. teniotis LR/lc
Family: Rhinolophidae
Subfamily: Rhinolophinae
Genus: Rhinolophus
 Greater horseshoe bat, R. ferrumequinum LR/nt

Order: Cetacea (whales, dolphins, and porpoises) 

The order Cetacea includes whales, dolphins and porpoises. They are the mammals most fully adapted to aquatic life with a spindle-shaped nearly hairless body, protected by a thick layer of blubber, and forelimbs and tail modified to provide propulsion underwater.

Suborder: Mysticeti
Family: Balaenidae
Genus: Balaena
 Bowhead whale, Balaena mysticetus (Sea of Okhotsk) EN
Genus: Eubalaena
 North Pacific right whale, Eubalaena japonica CR
Family: Eschrichtiidae
Genus: Eschrichtius
 Western gray whale, Eschrichtius robustus CR
Family: Balaenopteridae
Subfamily: Megapterinae
Genus: Megaptera
 Humpback whale, Megaptera novaeangliae (Sea of Japan and Yellow/Bohai Seas) EN
Subfamily: Balaenopterinae
Genus: Balaenoptera
 Common minke whale, Balaenoptera acutorostrata (Sea of Japan and Yellow/Bohai Seas) EN
 Northern sei whale, Balaenoptera borealis EN
 Bryde's whale, Balaenoptera brydi DD
 Eden's whale, Balaenoptera edeni (East China Sea) CR 
 Northern blue whale, Balaenoptera musculus CR
 Omura's whale, Balaenoptera omurai DD
 Northern fin whale, Balaenoptera physalus CR
Suborder: Odontoceti
Superfamily: Platanistoidea
Family: Phocoenidae
Genus: Neophocaena
 Sunameri, Neophocaena phocaenoides phocaenoides VU
Genus: Phocoena
 Harbor porpoise, Phocoena phocoena VU 
Genus: Phocoenoides
 Dall's porpoise, Phocoenoides dalli LR/cd
Family: Physeteridae
Genus: Physeter
 Sperm whale, Physeter macrocephalus VU
Family: Kogiidae
Genus: Kogia
 Pygmy sperm whale, Kogia breviceps LR/lc
 Dwarf sperm whale, Kogia sima LR/lc
Family: Ziphidae
Subfamily: Ziphiinae
Genus: Ziphius
 Cuvier's beaked whale, Ziphius cavirostris LC
Subfamily: Berardiinae
Genus: Berardius
 Baird's beaked whale, Berardius bairdii LR/cd
Subfamily: Hyperoodontinae
Genus: Mesoplodon
 Blainville's beaked whale, Mesoplodon densirostris DD
 Ginkgo-toothed beaked whale, Mesoplodon ginkgodens DD
 Stejneger's beaked whale, Mesoplodon stejnegeri DD
Family: Delphinidae (marine dolphins)
Genus: Steno
 Rough-toothed dolphin, Steno bredanensis DD
Genus: Stenella
 Pantropical spotted dolphin, Stenella attenuata LR/cd
 Striped dolphin, Stenella coeruleoalba LR/cd
 Spinner dolphin, Stenella longirostris LR/cd
Genus: Delphinus
 Long-beaked common dolphin, Delphinus capensis LR/lc
 Short-beaked common dolphin, Delphinus delphis LR/lc
Genus: Tursiops
 Common bottlenose dolphin, Tursiops truncatus LR/lc
Genus: Lagenorhynchus
 Pacific white-sided dolphin, Lagenorhynchus obliquidens LR/lc
Genus: Lissodelphis
 Northern right whale dolphin, Lissodelphis borealis LR/lc
Genus: Grampus
 Risso's dolphin, Grampus griseus DD
Genus: Feresa
 Pygmy killer whale, Feresa attenuata DD
Genus: Pseudorca
 False killer whale, Pseudorca crassidens DD
Genus: Orcinus
 Killer whale, Orcinus orca (Sea of Japan and Yellow/Bohai Seas) EN
Genus: Globicephala
 Short-finned pilot whale, Globicephala macrorhyncus DD

Order: Carnivora (carnivorans) 

There are over 260 species of carnivorans, the majority of which feed primarily on meat. They have a characteristic skull shape and dentition.

Suborder: Feliformia
Family: Felidae (cats)
Subfamily: Felinae
Genus: Lynx
 Eurasian lynx, L. lynx 
Genus: Prionailurus
 Leopard cat, P. bengalensis 
Subfamily: Pantherinae
Genus: Panthera
 Leopard, P. pardus extirpated
 Amur leopard, P. p. orientalis  extirpated
 Tiger, P. tigris extirpated
 Siberian tiger, P. t. tigris   extirpated
Suborder: Caniformia
Family: Canidae (dogs, foxes)
Genus: Vulpes
 Red fox, V. vulpes possibly extirpated
 Korean fox, V. v. peculiosa  possibly extirpated
Genus: Nyctereutes
 Raccoon dog, N. procyonoides  
Genus: Canis (canines)
 Grey wolf, C. lupus 
 Mongolian wolf, C. l. chanco 
Genus: Cuon
 Dhole, C. alpinus extirpated
 Ussuri dhole, C. a. alpinus extirpated
Family: Ursidae (bears)
Genus: Ursus
 Brown bear, U. arctos   extirpated
 Ussuri brown bear, U. a. lasiotus extirpated
 Asiatic black bear, U. thibetanus  
Family: Mustelidae (mustelids)
Genus: Lutra
 European otter, L. lutra  
Genus: Martes
 Yellow-throated marten, M. flavigula LR/lc
Genus: Meles
 Asian badger, M. leucurus LR/lc
Genus: Mustela
 Least weasel, M. nivalis LR/lc
 Siberian weasel, M. sibirica LR/lc
Family: Otariidae (eared seals, sealions)
Genus: Callorhinus
 Northern fur seal, C. ursinus  , vagrant
Genus: Eumetopias
 Steller sea lion, E. jubatus  , vagrant
Genus: Zalophus
 Japanese sea lion, Z. japonicus  
Family: Phocidae (earless seals)
Genus: Phoca
 Spotted seal, P. largha  
 Common seal, P. vitulina LR/lc
Genus: Pusa
 Ringed seal, P. hispida LR/lc

Order: Artiodactyla (even-toed ungulates) 

The even-toed ungulates are ungulates whose weight is borne about equally by the third and fourth toes, rather than mostly or entirely by the third as in perissodactyls. There are about 220 artiodactyl species, including many that are of great economic importance to humans.

Family: Suidae (pigs)
Subfamily: Suinae
Genus: Sus
 Wild boar, S. scrofa LR/lc
Family: Moschidae
Genus: Moschus
 Siberian musk deer, M. moschiferus  
Family: Cervidae (deer)
Subfamily: Cervinae
Genus: Cervus
 Elk, C. canadensis 
 Manchurian wapiti, C. c. xanthopygus  extirpated
 Sika deer, C. nippon 
 Manchurian sika deer, C. n. mantchuricus extirpated
 Formosan sika deer, C. n. taiouanus introduced
Subfamily: Hydropotinae
Genus: Hydropotes
 Water deer, H. inermis LR/nt
Subfamily: Capreolinae
Genus: Capreolus
 Siberian roe deer, C. pygargus LR/lc
Family: Bovidae (cattle, antelope, sheep, goats)
Subfamily: Bovinae
Genus: Bos
 Aurochs, B. primigenius 
Subfamily: Caprinae
Genus: Nemorhaedus
 Long-tailed goral, N. caudatus  

List of mammals of Korea
Wildlife of Korea
List of mammals of North Korea
List of chordate orders
Lists of mammals by region
Mammal classification

Notes

References
 

.
Mammals
South Korea
South Korea